Compared to other European nations, the French are not avid newspaper readers, citing only 164 adults out of every 1000 as newspaper readers.

The French press was healthiest in the aftermath of World War II. A year after the end of the war, 28 papers had a combined circulation of about 7 million. However, seven years later that figure had been nearly halved. This decline was principally due to the greater popularity of the broadcast media and the subsequent diversion of advertising revenues. Since 2000 newly produced free papers have further weakened the established press. Still, 80 daily papers remain, and there is a wide range of weeklies, many of which now feature internet sites.

Regional papers have remained relatively unaffected by the decline, with provincial newspapers commanding a higher degree of reader loyalty. For example, Ouest-France, sells almost twice as many copies as any of the national dailies.

Books

Hachette Livre 
Editis

Newspapers

In the early 21st century, the best-selling daily was the regional Ouest-France in 47 local editions,  followed by Le Progres of Lyon, La Voix du Nord in Lille, and Provençal in Marseille. In Paris the Communists published l'Humanite while Le Monde and Figaro had local rivals in Le Parisien, L'Aurore and the leftist Libération.

Daily newspapers and circulation
Below are the circulation figures of France's national daily newspapers from the Alliance pour les chiffres de la presse et des médias

(updated: 30/03/2021)

Regional daily newspapers

Television channels

The list below does not include Cable and Satellite television channels.

Main networks
TF1 – private
Canal+ – private
M6 – private
France 2 – public
France 3 – public
France 5 – public
Arte – public France/Germany
TV5Monde – worldwide broadcast of national programming of francophone countries (France, Swiss, Belgium, Canada) made by Television Suisse Romande, Radio-Canada, RTBF, France 2, France 3, Arte
24/7 news channels
BFM TV – private
I>Télé – private
LCI – private
Euronews – private
France 24 – public
Musical Channels
D17 – private
MCM – private
W9 – private
MTV France – private
 Others
D8 – private
TMC – private
AB1 – private
NRJ 12 – private
France 4 – Public
La Chaîne parlementaire – the parliamentary channel – political programming (French version of C-SPAN)

Radio stations in France

 BFM
 Chérie FM
 Essentiel Radio
 Europe 1
 Virgin Radio
 Fun Radio (France)
 Nostalgie
 NRJ
 Phare FM
 Radio des autoroutes SANEF
 Radio FG
 Radio France
 France Inter
 France Info
 France Culture
 France Musique
 France Bleu
 FIP (radio)
 Le Mouv'
 RMC (France)
 RTL
 RTL2
 Skyrock

See also
 Culture of France
 History of French journalism
 Office de Radiodiffusion Télévision Française
 Telecommunications in France
 Open access in France

References

Bibliography

External links
 Regular French Press Review - Radio France International
 Broadcast Media in France - at Discover France (English)
 Print Media in France - at Discover France (English)
 English translations of articles from French newspapers at nonprofit WorldMeets.US
 

 
France
France